The 2013 Race of Champions was due to be the 26th running of the Race of Champions, and was due to take place over 14–15 December 2013 at the Rajamangala Stadium in Bangkok, Thailand. However the event was cancelled on 2 December due to political unrest in Bangkok.

Participants
Champions from numerous series were invited, while also invited was nine-time 24 Hours of Le Mans winner Tom Kristensen.

Listed below are drivers who had been announced to compete prior to the event's cancellation.

Cars
Cars that had been announced.

 Ariel Atom
 Audi R8 LMS
 KTM X-Bow
 Euro Racecar
 ROC Car
 Toyota GT86
 Volkswagen Scirocco

The track
A 697 metres tarmac track was constructed in the Rajamangala Stadium. The track had a bridge to connect the outer lane with the inner lane in an 8 shape track. All the races were planned to be 2 laps (1.394 km).

References

External links
 

Race of Champions
Race of Champions
Sport in Bangkok
Race of Champions
Auto races in Thailand
Race of Champions 2013